Cao Xá may refer to several places in Vietnam, including:

Cao Xá, Bắc Giang, a commune of Tân Yên District
Cao Xá, Phú Thọ, a commune of Lâm Thao District